Ouca is a village and a civil parish of the municipality of Vagos, Portugal. The population in 2011 was 1,805, in an area of 16.29 km2.

References

Freguesias of Vagos